Diospyros perfida is a tree in the family Ebenaceae. Inflorescences bear up to three flowers. The specific epithet  is from the Latin meaning "unsafe", referring to the allegedly poisonous fruits. Habitat is lowland mixed dipterocarp forests. D. perfida is endemic to Borneo.

References

perfida
Plants described in 1933
Endemic flora of Borneo
Trees of Borneo